The 1961–62 season of the European Cup Winners' Cup club football tournament was won by Atlético Madrid of Spain in a replayed final against holders Fiorentina. It was the first season of the tournament to be directly organised by UEFA.

Bracket

Preliminary round

|}

First leg

Second leg

Dunfermline Athletic won 8–1 on aggregate.

First round

|}

First leg

Second leg

Fiorentina won 9–3 on aggregate.

Leixões won 2–1 on aggregate.

Quarter-finals

|}

Notes
 Note 1: Second leg played in Gera after visas denied to the East German players.

First leg

Second leg

Fiorentina won 4–2 on aggregate.

Semi-finals

|}

First leg

Second leg

Atlético Madrid won 5–0 on aggregate.

Fiorentina won 3–0 on aggregate.

Final

Replay

See also
 1961–62 European Cup
 1961–62 Inter-Cities Fairs Cup

References

External links
 Cup Winners' Cup 1961-62 Results at UEFA.com
 Cup Winners' Cup results at Rec.Sport.Soccer Statistics Foundation
  Cup Winners Cup Seasons 1961-62 – results, protocols
 website Football Archive  1961–62 Cup Winners Cup

3
UEFA Cup Winners' Cup seasons